Ectoedemia piperella is a moth of the family Nepticulidae. It was described by Wilkinson and Newton in 1981. It is known from Arkansas.

The wingspan is 6.4-8.2 mm

References

Nepticulidae
Moths of North America
Moths described in 1981